Holocneminus is a genus of cellar spiders that was first described by Lucien Berland in 1942.  it contains only three species, found only in Oceania and Asia: H. huangdi, H. multiguttatus, and H. piritarsis.

See also
 List of Pholcidae species

References

Araneomorphae genera
Pholcidae
Spiders of Asia
Taxa named by Lucien Berland